Esme mudiensis is a damselfly in the family Platycnemididae. It is commonly known as the Travancore bambootail. It is endemic to the Western Ghats in India, particularly south of Palakkad Gap.

Description and habitat
It is a medium sized damselfly with black-capped blue eyes. Its thorax is velvet-black on the dorsum and azure blue on the sides. The dorsum is marked with narrow ante-humeral blue stripes, and there is another moderately broad black stripe over the postero-lateral suture. The base of the sides is pale blue. Wings are transparent with black and diamond shaped pterostigma. The abdomen is black, marked with azure blue on segment 1 and 2. Segments 3 to 6 have very narrow baso-dorsal annules. Segments 8 to 10 are blue. There is a narrow black basal annule on segment 8. The ventral borders of all segments are broadly black. Anal appendages are black. The female is similar to the male, but with a more robust build. 

It can be easily distinguished from other species of Esme by the labrum being entirely unmarked with metallic blue-black.

It is usually found along hill streams, and seen perched on riparian vegetation.

See also 
 List of odonates of India
 List of odonata of Kerala

References

External links

Platycnemididae
Insects of India
Insects described in 1931
Taxa named by Frederic Charles Fraser